Oaktree International School, Kolkata, West Bengal, India, was a co-educational and residential school following the IB (International Baccalaureate) syllabus. It was Eastern India's first authorized IB World School.  The School was located at Joka, 15 kilometers south of the heart of Kolkata, and operated on a sprawling 30-acre site. Oaktree International School imparted the IB MYP, DP and IGCSE curriculums. It also provided full, weekly and day boarding facilities.
The school offered Grades 6 - 12.

The website for the school noted it was not taking admissions for 2014–2015.

Mission statement

The Mission Statement of the School was as follows:
"Oaktree International School will provide its students with a world-class education by nurturing self-confidence, self-discipline, critical thinking and creativity which will encourage in them an enduring love of knowledge and the passion and sense of improvement, as well as responsibility to make a positive difference in the lives of others through their own actions and example."

Management 

The school management included Paul Regan as Head of School.

Campus 

The Oaktree International School campus was a purpose-built facility and is located on Diamond Harbour Road, Joka. It was spread over a total area of 30 acres of land. The Campus is currently undergoing expansion and in its present form, includes a basketball court, a badminton court, a football field, and a gymnasium, along with a dedicated refectory, canteen, common assembly area, an administrative office and a host of other modular buildings serving specific areas of running the School.

Program 

The language of instruction at Oaktree International is English.

See also
Education in India
List of schools in India
Education in West Bengal

Notes

References 

Times of India report on panel discussion hosted by Oaktree International School

External links
Official website

International Baccalaureate schools in India
Boarding schools in West Bengal
Defunct schools in India
High schools and secondary schools in Kolkata
International schools in Kolkata
Year of disestablishment missing
Educational institutions in India with year of establishment missing